Bake Town is an urban town in Changshou District, Chongqing, People's Republic of China.

Administrative division
The town is divided into 15 villages, the following areas: Bake Village, Fengsheng Village, Shima Village, Shuguang Village, Wuhua Village, Xingfu Village, Shuijing Village, Hetao Village, Xinqiao Village, Gaoxin Village, Meiman Village, Fuhe Village, Luping Village, Zitong Village, and Gantan Village (八颗村、丰胜村、石马村、曙光村、武华村、幸福村、水井村、核桃村、新桥村、高新村、美满村、付何村、鹿坪村、梓潼村、干滩村).

External links

Divisions of Changshou District
Subdistricts of the People's Republic of China